Bärbel Graf is a retired East German high jumper.

She finished ninth at the 1966 European Championships. She also became East German champion in 1966, competing for the sports club SC DHfK Leipzig.

References

Year of birth missing (living people)
Living people
East German female high jumpers
SC DHfK Leipzig athletes